Oley Dibba-Wadda is a Gambian activist. She is president and CEO of the Gam Africa Institute for Leadership (GAIL) She was a 2019 Amujae Initiative fellow.

Life 
Dibba-Wadda graduated from the University of East Anglia.

She was Executive Secretary of the Association for the Development of Education in Africa. She was the Executive Director of the Forum for African Women Educationalists.  She was Executive Director of Femmes Africa Solidarité. She is Director of Human Capital, at the African Development Bank. She publicly joined the Gambian United Democratic Party in early January 2020.

Works

References

External links 

 Official website
 https://luminosfund.org/leadership-series/oley-dibba-wadda/

Living people
Year of birth missing (living people)
Alumni of the University of East Anglia

Gambian activists
COVID-19 pandemic in Africa
Women's health movement